Universal Daddy is the sixth single by Alphaville, and their second from their album Afternoons in Utopia. It was released only in Europe.

Reviews
This song was described as one of the album's best songs and reminiscent of the kind of music that their contemporaries the Pet Shop Boys might produce. Despite the praise, the song is one of singer Marian Gold's least favorite Alphaville songs ever, saying simply that "the lyrics are the most embarrassing ones I've ever written".

Track listings
 7" single
 "Universal Daddy" — 3:57
 "Next Generation" — 3:58

 12" single
 "Universal Daddy (Aquarian Dance Mix)" — 6:16
 "Next Generation" — 3:58

 The writing credit for "Next Generation" is listed as "Gold/Lloyd/Echolette/Ryan"
 The B-side also appears on the US single release of "Red Rose", and a new remix of the song appears on 1999's Dreamscapes

 US Promotional 12" single (PR-978)
 "Universal Daddy (Vocal/Extended Remix)" — 6:15
 "Universal Daddy (Vocal/LP Version)" 3:54

 The "Vocal/Extended Remix" is the same as the UK's "Aquarian Dance Mix"
 In 2014, the "Aquarian Dance Mix" and the unaltered b-side "Next Generation" were released for the first time on CD on so80s presents Alphaville.

Charts

Other releases
One demo of this song was released on the album Dreamscapes, and another on the fan-only release History.

Notes

Alphaville (band) songs
1986 singles
Songs written by Marian Gold
Songs written by Ricky Echolette
Songs written by Bernhard Lloyd
Atlantic Records singles
Warner Music Group singles
1986 songs